Constitution 1857 National Park is located in the pine forests of the Sierra de Juárez mountain range in the northern part of Baja California, Mexico. The park is an important preserve for many native wild animals like bighorn sheep and mule deer. The park is characterized by the large variety of coniferous plant species.

History

The park was created by decree of the Mexican federal government on April 27, 1962. It was important to create a protected area to preserve the forest and the ecosystem that it sustains. The park is deeply appreciated for its beauty and the existence of small lakes. The park is named after the 1857 Constitution of Mexico.

Geography

Constitution 1857 National Park is a 5,009 hectare mountainous area located in the northern part of Baja California, Mexico.

The park is mostly located in the valley of the Hanson Plain characterized by granite and sand beds surrounded by the Sierra de Juárez. Hanson Lake is the main lake in the park, but there are several dry lakes on the Hanson Plain that hold water for only part of the year. The Hanson Plain is thought to have formed during the Mesozoic Era. The Sierra de Juárez is a subdivision of the mountain range named the Cordillera Baja California, which is an extension of the Sierra Nevada mountain range.

Climate

A temperate subhumid climate cool winters and warm summers. Winter is considered the wet season; several rainstorms and a few snowstorms allow several lakes to appear on the Hanson Plain. During the winter, many of the lakes freeze over due to shallow depths and low temperatures at night. During the summer, the rate of evaporation and low humidity dry most of the lakes that appeared during the wet season.

Flora and fauna

Constitution 1857 National Park and Sierra de San Pedro Mártir National Park are the main terrestrial wildlife refuges on the peninsula of Baja California, with many regionally important native plant and animal species.

The Sierra de Juárez contains several coniferous species; the most abundant are: Pinus jeffreyi, Pinus ponderosa, Pinus cembroide, Pinus quadrifolia, Pinus monophylla, Juniperus, Arctostaphylos drupacea, Artemisa ludoviciana, and Adenostoma esparcifolium. The flora shares many species with the Laguna Mountains and the San Jacinto Mountains in southwestern California. The lower elevations of the Sierra de Juárez are characterized by chaparral and desert shrub.

The fauna throughout the park includes many mammals, primarily mule deer, bighorn sheep, cougars, bobcats, ringtails, coyotes, rabbits, squirrels and more than 30 species of bats. The park is also home to many avian species, like bald eagles, golden eagles, black vultures, falcons woodpeckers, crows, and several species of nuthatches and ducks.

References

External links
Bajaquest.com: Constitution 1857 National Park — including Laguna Hanson/Hanson's Lagoon.
—Descubrebajacalifornia.com: Información sobre la Laguna Hanson
—Ecoturismolatino.com: Información general del Parque Nacional de Constitución 1857

National parks of Mexico
Protected areas of Baja California
Geography of Ensenada Municipality
Landmarks in Ensenada
Natural history of Baja California
 
Ramsar sites in Mexico
1962 establishments in Mexico
Protected areas established in 1962